Romance  is a solo album by session keyboardist  Dave Palmer. The album has seven piano solo tracks and two tracks, which are a trio of piano, drums and bass. The music is self described as "at once somber and beautiful, melancholy and hopeful." The piano is a "Blüthner Grand from the early 1900s."

Track listing

Musicians 
 Dave Palmer - piano
 Ethan Johns - drums
 Edwin Livingstone - bass

References 

2006 albums
Jazz albums by American artists